Sayed Abutalib Mozaffari, (born 1966) is a poet and writer from Afghanistan.

Early life 
Sayed Abutalib Mozaffari was born in 1966 in Khas Urozgan District of Urozgan Province of Afghanistan.
Mozzaffari is one of the famous Persian poets who printed his poetry in Iran's school books. His poetry is in the Persian language, and he has both poetry and literature in Afghanistan and Iranian languages.

Bibliography 
Soognama_e Balkh (Obituary of Balkh), poetry 
Payatakht_e Pariyan (the capital of fairies)
Uqab chegona mimirad (how do eagles dise)

Media activity 
Mozaffari published some of his poetry and writing in Dorr_e_dari magazine, which featured pieces on literature, art and culture. Mozaffari was the magazine's editor.

See also 
 List of Hazara people

References 

21st-century Afghan poets
21st-century Afghan writers
Afghan literary critics
Hazara writers
Hazara poets
Living people
1966 births
People from Urozgan Province